The county of Dorset, is and has been divided in many ways.

Unitary authorities
 Dorset Council
 Bournemouth, Christchurch and Poole Council

These authorities are divided into wards for electoral purposes.

Boroughs
 See List of boroughs in Dorset Boroughs were also divided into wards for electoral purposes.
 See List of sanitary districts in Dorset

Constituencies
 See List of parliamentary constituencies in Dorset

Civil parishes
 See List of civil parishes in Dorset

Hundreds
 See List of hundreds in Dorset

Liberties
 See List of liberties in Dorset

See also
 List of places in Dorset
 List of settlements in Dorset by population